Bourn Airport  is located  west of Cambridge, Cambridgeshire, England. The airfield was originally constructed during World War II as RAF Bourn and was principally used as a base for heavy bombers - Wellingtons, Stirlings and Lancasters were all based at Bourn at one time or another. Nowadays, the airfield is used for recreational use, and flight training has been provided by the Bourn Rural Flying Corps for in excess of 30 years.

As of 2021 the site is owned by Countryside Plc, who intend to build 3500 houses.

References

External links
Rural Flying Corps

Airports in England
Transport in Cambridgeshire
Airports in the East of England